Václav Pilát (6 May 1888 – 28 January 1971) was a Czechoslovak footballer. He competed in the men's tournament at the 1920 Summer Olympics. On a club level, he played for AC Sparta Prague.

References

External links
 

1888 births
1971 deaths

Czechoslovak footballers
Czechoslovakia international footballers
Olympic footballers of Czechoslovakia
Footballers at the 1920 Summer Olympics
Footballers from Prague
Association football forwards
AC Sparta Prague players